During the 1956–57 English football season, Arsenal F.C. competed in the Football League First Division. They finished with a total of 50 points, while coming out victorious in 21 games, losing 13, and finishing 8 in a draw. They finished fifth place in the league just below Preston North End and Blackpool, which was a mediocre season for this organization.

Season summary

Final league table

Results
Arsenal's score comes first

Legend

Football League First Division

FA Cup

Squad

References

Arsenal F.C. seasons
Arsenal